Azobenzene reductase also known as azoreductase is an enzyme that catalyzes the chemical reaction:

N,N-dimethyl-1,4-phenylenediamine + aniline + NADP+  4-(dimethylamino)azobenzene + NADPH + H+

The 3 substrates of this enzyme are N,N-dimethyl-1,4-phenylenediamine, aniline, and nicotinamide adenine dinucleotide phosphate ion, whereas its 3 products are 4-(dimethylamino)azobenzene, nicotinamide adenine dinucleotide phosphate, and hydrogen ion.

This enzyme belongs to the family of oxidoreductases, specifically those acting on other nitrogenous compounds as donors with NAD+ or NADP+ as acceptor.

Mechanism 

The reaction catalyzed by this enzyme proceeds via a ping-pong mechanism by using 2 equivalents of NAD(P)H to reduce one equivalent of the azo compound substrate (for example methyl red where Ar = p-dimethylaniline and Ar' = o-benzoic acid) into two equivalents of aniline product:

 Ar–N=N–Ar' + 2(NAD(P)H + H+)  Ar–NH2 + NH2–Ar' + 2NAD(P)+

Substrate specificity 

Most azoreductase isoenzymes can reduce methyl red, but are not able to reduce sulfonated azo dyes. The unique azoreductase isozyme from Bacillus sp. B29 has the ability to reduce sulfonated azo dyes however.

Nomenclature 

The systematic name of this enzyme class is N,N-dimethyl-1,4-phenylenediamine, aniline:NADP+ oxidoreductase. Other names in common use include:

 azo reductase, 
 azoreductase, 
 azo-dye reductase, 
 dibromopropylaminophenylazobenzoic azoreductase, 
 dimethylaminobenzene reductase, 
 methyl red azoreductase, 
 N,N-dimethyl-4-phenylazoaniline azoreductase, 
 NAD(P)H:1-(4'-sulfophenylazo)-2-naphthol oxidoreductase, 
 NADPH2-dependent azoreductase, 
 NADPH2:4-(dimethylamino)azobenzene oxidoreductase,
 NC-reductase, 
 new coccine (NC)-reductase,
 nicotinamide adenine dinucleotide (phosphate) azoreductase, 
 orange I azoreductase, 
 orange II azoreductase, 
 p-aminoazobenzene reductase, and
 p-dimethylaminoazobenzene azoreductase.

Structural studies 

Please check the last updated data on RCSB PDB site.

References

Further reading 

 
 

EC 1.7.1
NADPH-dependent enzymes
Enzymes of known structure